Edward Aglionby may refer to:
Edward Aglionby (died c. 1591) (1520–c. 1591), MP for Carlisle, and for Warwick, and poet
Edward Aglionby (died 1553), MP for Carlisle
Edward Aglionby (died 1599), MP for Carlisle
Edward Aglionby (1587–1648), MP for Carlisle (UK Parliament constituency)